Barbed tape or razor wire is a mesh of metal strips with sharp edges whose purpose is to prevent passage by humans. The term "razor wire", through long usage, has generally been used to describe barbed tape products. Razor wire is much sharper than the standard barbed wire; it is named after its appearance but is not razor sharp. The points are very sharp and made to rip and snag clothing and flesh.

The multiple blades of a razor-wire fence are designed to inflict serious cuts on anyone attempting to climb through or over it and therefore also has a strong psychological deterrent effect. Razor wire is used in many security applications because, although it can be circumvented relatively quickly by humans with tools, penetrating a razor-wire barrier without tools is very slow and typically injurious, often thwarting such attempts or giving security forces more time to respond.

Use 

Starting in the late 1960s, barbed tape was typically found in prisons and secure mental hospitals, where the increased breaching time for a poorly equipped potential escapee was a definite advantage. Until the development of reinforced barbed tape in the early 1980s (and especially after the September 11 attacks), it was rarely used for military purposes or genuine high security facilities because, with the correct tools, it was easier to breach than ordinary barbed wire. Since then, some military forces have replaced barbed wire with barbed tape for many applications, mainly because it is slightly lighter for the same effective coverage, and it takes up very little space compared to barbed wire or reinforced barbed tape when stored on drums.

More recently, barbed tape has been used in more commercial and residential security applications. This is often primarily a visual deterrent since a well-prepared burglar can breach barbed wire and barbed tape barriers in similar amounts of time, using simple techniques such as cutting the wire or throwing a piece of carpet over its strands.

Due to its dangerous nature, razor wire/barbed tape and similar fencing/barrier materials are prohibited in some locales. Norway prohibits any barbed wire except in combination with other fencing, in order to protect domesticated animals from exposure.

Construction 

Razor wire has a central strand of high tensile strength wire, and a steel tape punched into a shape with barbs. The steel tape is then cold-crimped tightly to the wire everywhere except for the barbs. Flat barbed tape is very similar, but has no central reinforcement wire. The process of combining the two is called roll forming.

Types 
Like barbed wire, razor wire is available as either straight wire, spiral (helical) coils, concertina (clipped) coils, flat wrapped panels or welded mesh panels. Unlike barbed wire, which usually is available only as plain steel or galvanized, barbed tape razor wire is also manufactured in stainless steel to reduce corrosion from rusting. The core wire can be galvanized and the tape stainless, although fully stainless barbed tape is used for permanent installations in harsh climatic environments or under water.

Barbed tape is also characterized by the shape of the barbs.

According to the structure 
 Helical type: Helical type razor wire is the most simple pattern. There are no concertina attachments and each spiral loop is left. It shows a natural spiral freely.
 Concertina type: It is the most widely used type in the security defense applications. The adjacent loops of helical coils are attached by clips at specified points on the circumference. It shows an accordion-like configuration condition.
 Blade type: The razor wire are produced in straight lines and cut into a certain length to be welded onto the galvanized or powder coated frame. It can be used individually as a security barrier.
 Flat type: A popular razor wire type with flat and smooth configuration (like Olympic rings). According to different technology, it can be clipped or the welded type.
 Welded type: The razor wire tape are welded into panels, then the panels are connected by clips or tie wires to form a continuous razor wire fence.
 Flattened type: A transformation of single coil concertina razor wire. The concertina wire is flattened to form the flat-type razor wire.

According to the coil type 
 Single coil: Commonly seen and widely used type, which is available in both helical and concertina types.
 Double coil: A complex razor wire type to supply higher security grade. A smaller diameter coil is placed inside of the larger diameter coil. It is also available in both helical and concertina types.

Common specifications of razor wire

See also 
 Access control
 Environmental design
 Physical security
 Wire obstacle
 Concertina wire

References

External links 
 

Fortification (architectural elements)
Area denial weapons